The 2003 Dakar Rally, also known as the 2003 Telefónica-Dakar Rally, was the 25th running of the Dakar Rally event.  The rally began on 1 January 2003 at Marseille in France and finished at Sharm el-Sheikh in Egypt on 19 January, with the course crossing North Africa.

Kenjiro Shinozuka, who won the event in 1997, suffered serious injury in an accident between Ghat and Sabha in Libya. Former world rally champion and four times winner of the Dakar Rally, Ari Vatanen, returned to take part in the rally, and won the ninth, thirteen and fifteen stages French co-driver, Bruno Cauvy died in an accident on the tenth stage when his car went out of control and overturned in sand dunes. Stephane Peterhansel took an early lead in the rally, but was forced out in the penultimate stage by mechanical problems. The rally was won for the second time in succession by Japanese driver, Hiroshi Masuoka. The motorcycle category was won for the third time by Richard Sainct.

Stages

  - Miki Biasion set the fastest time for the stage, but was stripped of the win after incurring a ten-hour penalty for a gearbox change in parc ferme conditions.

Stage Results

Motorcycles

Cars

Trucks

 - Vladimir Chagin's time includes a penalty of 5:30.

Final standings

Motorcycles

Cars

Trucks

References

Dakar Rally
D
Dakar Rally, 2003
2003 in French motorsport